Daniel J. "Dan" Mitchell is a libertarian economist and former senior fellow at the Cato Institute. He is a proponent of the flat tax and tax competition, financial privacy, and fiscal sovereignty.

Personal life
Mitchell was born on June 28, 1958 in Mt. Kisco, New York and grew up in Wilton, Connecticut. He graduated from Wilton High School in 1976, and went on to attend the University of Georgia in Athens, Georgia. After graduating from UGA in 1981 with a Bachelors in Economics, Mitchell went on to earn a Masters in Economics from UGA in 1985. Mitchell is also a brother of Phi Kappa Theta fraternity. Mitchell moved to the Washington, D.C. metropolitan area in 1985 to pursue a Ph.D. in Economics from George Mason University.

Professional life

Mitchell’s career as an economist began in the United States Senate, working for Oregon Senator Bob Packwood and the Senate Finance Committee. He also served on the transition team of President-Elect Bush and Vice President-Elect Quayle in 1988. In 1990, he began work at the Heritage Foundation. At Heritage, Mitchell worked on tax policy issues and began advocating for income tax reform.

In 2007, Mitchell left the Heritage Foundation, and joined the Cato Institute as a Senior Fellow. Mitchell continues to work in tax policy, and deals with issues such as the flat tax and international tax competition.

In addition to his Cato Institute responsibilities, Mitchell co-founded the Center for Freedom and Prosperity, an organization formed to protect international tax competition.

Publications
Mitchell’s work has been published in the Wall Street Journal, New York Times, Washington Times, Washington Post, National Review, Villanova Law Review, Public Choice, Journal of Regulation and Social Cost, Emory Law Journal, Forbes, USA Today, Offshore Investment, Playboy, Investor’s Business Daily, and Worldwide Reinsurance Review.

He is the author of Flat Tax: Freedom, Fairness, Jobs, and Growth (1996), and co-author with Chris Edwards of Tax Revolution: The Rise of Tax Competition and the Battle to Defend It (2008).

Mitchell's daily blog is Liberty – Restraining Government in America and Around the World. It discusses economic issues affecting sustainable freedom and prosperity.

Television appearances
Mitchell is a frequent commentator on television and has appeared on all the major networks, including CBS, NBC, ABC, FOX, CNN, CNBC, and C-SPAN. He currently makes a weekly appearances on Street Signs on Mondays at 2:00pm ET.

Videos
Mitchell narrates a YouTube video series for the Center of Freedom and Prosperity on topics such as flat tax, tax havens, and Keynesian economics.

References

External links
 Bio at the Center for Freedom and Prosperity
 Bio at the Cato Institute
 Bio at the Mises Institute
 

1958 births
Living people
American libertarians
The Heritage Foundation
Libertarian economists
Tax reform in the United States
Cato Institute people